Bo White is an American actor who appeared in Christopher Larkin's 1974 groundbreaking film, A Very Natural Thing, the gay alternative to Love Story (1970). He plays Jason, a divorced photographer, who meets a lonely English Literature teacher David (Robert Joel) during New York's 1973 Gay Pride celebration in the second half of the film and show the potential to form a long term relationship.

White's other films include Blue Summer (1973), Bible! (1974), Urban Playground (2002), and Crazy like a Fox (2004).

References
NY Times

External links

American male film actors
Living people
Year of birth missing (living people)